Ronnie Peacock (born September 5, 1950) is a former American football coach.  As a college player at Harding University, Peacock became the 8th player in college football history to catch 200 passes in a career. He was the 14th head football coach for the Abilene Christian University in Abilene, Texas, serving for two seasons, from 1991 to 1992, an compiling a record of 4–15.

Head coaching record

College

References

Living people
1950 births
American football wide receivers
Abilene Christian Wildcats football coaches
Arkansas Tech Wonder Boys football coaches
Harding Bisons football players
High school football coaches in Arkansas